Colegio Sagrado Corazón is a Chilean high school located in Rancagua, Cachapoal Province, Chile. The school will cease operations on 31 December 2014, because of a "constant enrollment decrease".

References 

Educational institutions with year of establishment missing
Secondary schools in Chile
Schools in Cachapoal Province